Cristian Franco Lema (born 24 March 1990) is an Argentine professional footballer who plays for Club Atlético Lanús as a centre-back.

Club career
Born in Puerto Madryn, Lema started his football career aged 8 at hometown club Guillermo Brown. He debuted for their senior team in 2007 and left the club in 2009.

A year later, Lema joined Newell's Old Boys and made his Argentine Primera División debut in a 0–0 home draw to Godoy Cruz in November. After playing 12 matches with the former side, he moved on loan to Tigre in June 2011, and there he played 11 matches, scoring one goal. In July 2012, aged 22, he was loaned out to Quilmes, with whom he would play 40 matches and score 2 goals before moving to Belgrano in 2014. In his four-year spell with the latter, he became the club's defender with the most league goals ever, 16 in 123 matches. Moreover, he debuted in Copa Sudamericana in 2015.

In June 2018, Lema moved to Portugal and signed a five-year contract with S.L. Benfica. In February 2019, after playing only two matches for the Lisbon side in October, he was loaned to Uruguayan club Peñarol until June 2019, with option to buy. Afterwards, he was loaned out to Newell's Old Boys for 2019–20. He left Benfica on 1 October 2020 to join Saudi Arabian club Damac FC.

On 18 February 2021, Lema returned to Newell's Old Boys, and signed a contract until December 2021.

Honours
Benfica
 Primeira Liga: 2018–19

References

External links
 

1990 births
Living people
People from Puerto Madryn
Argentine footballers
Association football defenders
Newell's Old Boys footballers
Club Atlético Tigre footballers
Quilmes Atlético Club footballers
Club Atlético Belgrano footballers
S.L. Benfica footballers
Peñarol players
Damac FC players
Argentine Primera División players
Primeira Liga players
Uruguayan Primera División players
Saudi Professional League players
Argentine expatriate footballers
Argentine expatriate sportspeople in Portugal
Argentine expatriate sportspeople in Uruguay
Argentine expatriate sportspeople in Saudi Arabia
Expatriate footballers in Portugal
Expatriate footballers in Uruguay
Expatriate footballers in Saudi Arabia